The Cenocoeliinae are a subfamily of braconid parasitoid wasps.

Description and distribution 
Cenocoeliines are medium-sized braconids (3-11 mm long) with relatively large heads. The metasoma is attached high above the hind legs on the propodeum in contrast to other braconids, where the attachment is just above the hind coxa. They are non-cyclostome and females have long ovipositors. Their wings are often darkly colored.

Cenocoeliinae have a worldwide distribution, but have been only rarely found in the Afrotropical region. Most species are described from the Nearctic, but many undescribed species have been found in Neotropical regions.

Biology 
Little is known about Cenocoeliinae biology, but records so far indicate they are koinobiont endoparasitoids of beetle larvae feeding within plants. Hosts include members of Cerambycidae, Curculionidae, Buprestidae, and Scolytinae.

Genera 
Genera placed here include:

 Aulacodes  Cresson, 1865 (homonym of Aulacodes Guenee, 1854, a genus of moths)
 Capitonius
 Cenocoelius
 Evaniomorpha
 Lestricus
 Rattana
 Ussurohelcon

References

External links 
 Photos on BugGuide
 [ww.boldsystems.org/index.php/Taxbrowser_Taxonpage?taxon=cenocoeliinae&searchMenu=taxonomy&query=cenocoeliinae DNA barcodes at BOLD systems]

Apocrita subfamilies
Braconidae